Beran (feminine Beranová) is a Czech surname meaning "ram/wether" (male sheep). The Polish and Slovak variant of this surname is Baran. Notable people with this surname include:

 Bruce Beran, American coast guard
 Christa Beran, Austrian rescuer of Holocaust victims
 Dave Beran, American chef
 Emerik Beran, Slovenian composer
 Jiří Beran, Czech fencer
 Josef Beran, Czech cardinal
 Ladislav Beran, Czech actor
 Lajos Berán, Hungarian sculptor 
 Matěj Beran, Czech ice hockey player
 Michal Beran (ice hockey), Slovak ice hockey player
 Rudolf Beran, Czech politician

See also
 

Czech-language surnames